Chorizo (from Spanish ; similar to but distinct from Portuguese  ) is a type of pork cured meat originating from the Iberian Peninsula.

In Europe, chorizo is a fermented, cured, smoked meat, which may be sliced and eaten without cooking, or added as an ingredient to add flavor to other dishes. Elsewhere, some sausages sold as chorizo may not be fermented and cured, and require cooking before eating. Spanish  and Portuguese  are distinctly different products, despite both getting their smokiness and deep red color from dried, smoked, red peppers (/).

It is also used as a partial replacement for ground (minced) beef or pork.

Names
 
The word chorizo probably comes from the Late Latin  'salted', via the Portuguese ; it is a doublet of the Spanish word  'sausage', which was transmitted through Italian .

In English, chorizo is usually pronounced , though sometimes the Castilian Spanish [θ] sound is used: .

Pronunciation and spelling vary slightly among the Iberian languages:
 Asturleonese:  
  
  
  
  
  ,

Varieties by region

Southern Europe

Spain

Spanish chorizo is made from coarsely chopped pork and pork fat, seasoned with garlic,  – a smoked paprika – and salt. Hundreds of regional varieties of Spanish chorizo, both smoked and unsmoked, may contain herbs, and other ingredients. For example, chorizo de Pamplona is a thicker sausage with the meat more finely ground.

Chorizo is made in short or long and hard or soft varieties; leaner varieties are suited to being eaten at room temperature as an appetizer or tapas, whereas the fattier versions are generally used for cooking. A rule of thumb is that long, thin chorizos are sweet, and short chorizos are spicy, although this is not always the case.

Portugal

It is made (at least) with pork, fat, paprika, garlic, and salt (wine and hot pepper also being common ingredients in some regions). It is then stuffed into natural casings from pig or lamb and slowly dried over smoke. The many different varieties differ in color, shape, spices and taste. White pepper, piri-piri, cumin and cinnamon are a common addition. The Portuguese varieties tend to be hotter than the Spanish ones.

A popular way to prepare chouriço is slicing it part-way through and cooking it over an alcohol flame at the table (sometimes called , but more commonly just chouriço assado) in purpose-made glazed earthenware dishes with a lattice top.

In Johannesburg, South Africa, the many Portuguese immigrants in the 1960s from Portugal and Mozambique tended to settle in a suburb called La Rochelle (Little Portugal). Most of them either returned to Portugal or moved on to more affluent suburbs in the city, but restaurants in the area and the very well-supported annual "Lusitoland" fundraiser festival have  on the menu.

In the heavily Portuguese counties in the US states of Rhode Island and southeastern Massachusetts,  is often served with little neck clams and white beans.  sandwiches on grinder rolls, with sautéed green peppers and onions, are commonly available at local delis and convenience stores. Stuffed quahogs (also known as stuffies), a Rhode Island specialty, usually include .

In Portugal,  can be made with blood, similar to blood sausage or black pudding and is called  (blood ) or morcela.

Americas

Mexico

Based on the uncooked Spanish  (fresh chorizo), the Mexican versions of chorizo are made not just from fatty pork, but also from beef, venison, chicken, turkey, and even tofu, kosher, and vegan versions are made. The meat is usually ground (minced) rather than chopped, and different seasonings are used. This type is better known in Mexico and other parts of the Americas, including the border areas of the United States, and is not frequently found in Europe. Due to culinary tradition and the high cost of imported Spanish smoked paprika, Mexican chorizo is usually made with native chili peppers of the same Capsicum annuum species, making it spicier than Spanish and Portuguese varieties of the sausage. Mexican longaniza are typically longer and spicier than chorizo.

Spanish-American cuisine adds vinegar instead of the white wine usually used in Spain.

The area around Toluca specializes in "green" chorizo, made with some combination of tomatillo, cilantro, chili peppers, and garlic. Most Mexican chorizo is a deep reddish color, and is largely available in two varieties, fresh and dried, though fresh is much more common. Some of the cheapest commercial chorizos use offal stuffed in inedible plastic casing to resemble sausage links, rather than muscle meat. Before consumption, the casing is usually cut open and the sausage is fried in a pan and mashed with a fork until it resembles finely minced ground beef. A common alternative recipe does not have casings. Pork and beef are cured overnight in vinegar and chili powder. Served for breakfast, lunch, or dinner, it has the finely minced texture mentioned above, and is quite intense in flavor.

It is made by mixing fried chorizo with scrambled eggs.  is often used in breakfast burritos, tacos, and taquitos. Another popular Mexican recipe is fried chorizo combined with pinto or black refried beans. In Mexico and the southwestern United States chorizo is also used to make  (or ), a popular appetizer consisting of small pieces of chorizo served with melted cheese and eaten with small corn tortillas or tortilla chips.

Central America and the Caribbean

Puerto Rican chorizo is a smoked, well-seasoned sausage nearly identical to the smoked versions in Spain. Puerto Rican and Dominican  have a very different taste and appearance. The seasoned meat is stuffed into a pork casing and is formed very long by hand. It is then hung to air-dry.  can then be fried in oil or cooked with rice or beans. It is eaten with many different dishes.

Salvadorean chorizo is short, fresh (not dried) and tied in twins.

United States 
In contrast to Spanish chorizo, in the United States the term generally refers to a sausage that is never dried, has a fattier filling, and is very spicy. It is most popular in areas with large Cuban, Dominican or Puerto Rican populations or near the Mexican border, especially in the Southwest near Chihuahua, Sonora, and Nuevo Leon. It is also found further north in places like Austin, Texas or Santa Fe, New Mexico, where its earliest evidence dates to well before the Wild West.

In Louisiana, Creole and Cajun cuisine both feature a variant of chorizo called , which is frequently used in the Creole dish of red beans and rice. As with its cousin to the west, smoking this variant is an acceptable practice in local cuisine.

South America

In Ecuador, many types of sausage have been directly adopted from European or North American cuisine. All sorts of salami, either raw or smoked, are known just as salami. Most commonly known are sorts from Spanish chorizo, Italian pepperoni, and wiener sausages; wieners are the most popular. , as in most Spanish-speaking countries, is basically cooked pork blood encased in pork intestine casing (black pudding in English).  is a thin sausage containing almost any mixture of meat, fat, or even cartilage, smoked rather than fresh. Chorizo is a mixture of chopped pork meat, pork fat, salt, whole pepper grains, cinnamon, achiote, and other spices, which produce its characteristic deep red color. A traditional dish consists of fried egg, mashed potatoes, avocado, salad, and slices of fried chorizo.

In Argentina, Uruguay, Bolivia, Peru, Colombia and Venezuela, chorizo is the name for any coarse meat sausage. Spanish-style chorizo is also available, and is distinguished by the name  ('Spanish chorizo'). Argentine chorizos are normally made of pork, and are not spicy hot. Some Argentine chorizos include other types of meat, typically beef.

In Bolivia, chorizos are made of pork, fried and served with salad (tomato, lettuce, onion, boiled carrots and ), and a slice of bread soaked with chorizo fat. Chorizo sandwiches, without , are also eaten.

South and Southeast Asia

East Timor

 is made in East Timor. It was introduced by the Portuguese, with their colonization of East Timor.

Goa

In Goa, India, which was ruled by the Portuguese for 450 years and has a large percentage of Goan Catholics,  is made from pork marinaded in a mixture of vinegar, red chilies, and spices such as garlic, ginger, cumin, turmeric, cloves, pepper, and cinnamon, which is stuffed into casings. These are enjoyed either with the local Goan Portuguese-style crusty bread, or pearl onions, or both. They are also used, cut into chunks, as the meat ingredient in rice pilaf. They can be raw (wet), smoked or cured through salting and air-drying.

Dry  is aged in the sun for long periods (three months or more). Wet  has been aged for about a month or less. Skin , also aged, is rare and difficult to find. It consists primarily of minced pork skin along with some of its subcutaneous fat. All three  are made in variations such as hot, medium, and mild. Typically, the wet varieties tend to be longer than the dry ones.

Goan  should be distinguished from "Goan frankfurters", which look similar to equivalents in the United States, but with a predominantly peppercorn flavor.

Philippines

Longaniza (Visayan: ,) are Philippine chorizos flavored with indigenous spices, and may be made of chicken, beef, or even tuna. While the term longaniza refers to fresh sausages, it is also used in the Philippines to refer to cured sausages. Philippine  are often dyed red with  seeds. There are dozens of variants from various regions in the Philippines.

See also
 Embutido
 Morcón
 List of dried foods
 List of sausages
 List of smoked foods

References

External links

 
 Portuguese sausage (linguiça) in Havai
 gmanews.tv/video, Vigan folk hold longanisa festival – 23 January 2008 (in Filipino)
 Nutrition Facts for chorizo

Basque sausages
Cuisine of the Southwestern United States
Dried meat
East Timorese cuisine
Galician cuisine
Goan cuisine
Indian sausages
Latin American cuisine
Mexican sausages
Philippine sausages
Portuguese sausages
Spanish sausages
Fermented sausages